A bifolium is a quartic plane curve with equation in Cartesian coordinates:

Construction and equations 

Given a circle C through a point O, and line L tangent to the circle at point O: for each point Q on C, define the point P such that PQ is parallel to the tangent line L, and PQ = OQ. The collection of points P forms the bifolium.

In polar coordinates, the bifolium's equation is

For a = 1, the total included area is approximately 0.10.

References

External links
Bifolium at MathWorld

Plane curves
Algebraic curves